Douglas Henry Alexander Scale (more commonly known as Doug Scale; born 24 January 1954) is a former Australian rules footballer who played for Geelong in the Victorian Football League (now known as the Australian Football League).

References

External links
 
 

1954 births
Living people
Geelong Football Club players
Australian rules footballers from Victoria (Australia)